Heartbreak on a Full Moon is the eighth studio album by American singer Chris Brown. The album is a double-disc, consisting of 45 tracks, and was released digitally on October 31, 2017, and onto CD three days later by RCA Records. Brown worked with several producers, including Prince Chrishan, A1, Amadeus, Boi-1da, D. A. Doman and Scott Storch. The album also features guest appearances by R. Kelly, Usher, Gucci Mane and Future. Recording sessions for Heartbreak on a Full Moon took place between the end of 2015 and August 2017.

Heartbreak on a Full Moon is an R&B album that also borrows from genres such as hip hop, alternative R&B, trap, and dancehall. Its lyrics are thought to have been inspired by Brown's breakup with Karrueche Tran.

One week after its release Heartbreak on a Full Moon was certified gold by the Recording Industry Association of America (RIAA) for combined sales and album-equivalent units of over 500,000 units in the United States, and became the first album by a R&B male artist since Usher's Confessions to be certified gold within a week. It has since been certified double platinum by the RIAA.

The album was preceded by six official singles: "Grass Ain't Greener", "Party", "Privacy", "Pills & Automobiles", "Questions", and "Tempo".

Background and recording
The album was inspired by the singer's breakup with actress Karrueche Tran in March 2015, after he had a daughter, Royalty, with model Nia Guzman. Brown had dedicated his seventh studio album Royalty to his daughter, and decided that the next album would be about his breakup with Tran.

Brown started recording tracks for the album a few weeks before the release of Royalty in late 2015. He continued working on the album during 2016 and 2017 in between the European leg of the One Hell of a Nite Tour and The Party Tour. Brown also built a home recording studio to record songs for the album. The recording sessions mostly took place in Los Angeles and New York City. One track, "Bite My Tongue", was left over from the sessions for Royalty. 

During the album's creation, Brown believed he had made too many high-quality songs to fit on a 15–20 track album, so he decided to make a 40-track album. RCA Records initially did not want to release an album of such length, thinking this would damage its commercial performance, but the singer ended up convincing them otherwise. Brown involved over 50 producers, including A1, Amadeus, Prince Chrishan, Scott Storch, D.A. Got That Dope, Hitmaka and OG Parker, in the recording sessions. Recording eventually ended in August 2017, with "Rock Your Body" being the last track completed.

He explained the concept for the album in August 2017 during an interview for Complex. saying:

Music and lyrics 

Heartbreak on a Full Moon is an R&B album, with a sound that has been described by critics as "dark" and "soulful", with songs like "Lost & Found", "This Ain't", "Nowhere" or "Paradise" representing it. The production and melody of some songs was noted for being "horror-themed", in songs such as "Pull Up", "Party", "Sensei" or "High End". Brown performances on the album often switch from his R&B singing to his rapping.

The songs on the album are characterized by their "sentimental", "sultry", "personal" and "explicit" songwriting, showing every emotional aspect of what's been on the singer's mind after a heavy breakup. Its themes include remorse, love transforming into hate, internal conflict and the impossibility of getting over someone, while depicting the singer's try to escape his sorrows through a reckless lifestyle full of sex with multiple women, parties and drugs, then realizing how that behaviour can't numb the pain of his heartbreak. The album also has a couple of episodes where the singer faces themes of police brutality and dark side of fame. According to Andy Kellman of AllMusic, the character portrayed by Brown on Heartbreak on a Full Moon "often mood swings from playboy-hedonistic to sweet-romantic to scorned-acidic to sorrowful-heartbroken". Analyzing its lyrical content Prezzy of The Boombox said that "throughout the first disc the singer tries to exorcise the demons of love lost, while on the second one he mostly pours out the torments of his heartbreak". Vultures writer Craig Jenkins found the sexual content of various songs of the first half of Heartbreak on a Full Moon to be "loaded with raunchy invitations for sex" and filled with "X-rated" subjects like "sex in hallways, drunken hookups, and girls who mix cocaine and painkillers. Jenkins wrote that the "breakup tracks' intensity" is elevated by "shattered, jilted reflection and profound yearning" transmitted through Brown's "pleading tenor voice".

 Songs 
The lyrical content of the album starts with the opening track "Lost & Found", branching out in a plot that poetically and explicitly explains the bitter pain of the heartbreak caused by a woman dependent on the good life, being sung in perspective to the direct interested. The production of the song is dominated by a slow chord of a warm and atmospheric bass, accompanied by maliconic guitar chords and sporadic percussions. Brown's vocals in the song are proportioned to the emotion of the lyrics, by having a melancholic intonation in the first verse, becoming more demanding and aggressive in the second, ending with a third verse rapped in an auto-tuned aggressively sad way, where the voice effect suggests the absence of sobriety of the singer on whom his heavy words depend. Throughout the album the lyrics depict the pain of the singer reflected on his thoughts and feelings, and how he tries to escape it with parties, sex and drugs. On the hip hop-influenced songs "Everybody Knows" and "Hurt the Same", the singer angrily accuses the woman he loved for being insensitive and ungrateful, making straightforward references to his relationship with Tran. He humbly apologizes to her ex-girlfriend for his actions that hurted her on songs like "Enemy", "Tough Love" and "Even", sadly reminiscing the best moments passed with her. On tracks like "Privacy", "To My Bed", "Covered In You", "Tell Me What to Do" and "Rock Your Body" he tells sexual adventures, approaching women in sultry ways. 

On the mournful "This Ain't" the singer tries to have a love relationship with another woman, but realizes that their relationship is just sex with no love involvement. On tracks like "Sip", "Hope You Do", "Pull Up" and "Pills & Automobiles" he finds himself in intimate situations with girls, being under the influence of alcohol or drugs. "Nowhere" is a soul-tinged song where he expresses his impossibility of getting over his ex-girlfriend. On the dancehall pop track "If You're Down" he asks his loved one to turn her back on the complicated and frustrating things in life and instead decide to live in the moment with him embracing each other. On "Paradise" he looks back at the relationship with his ex-girl admitting that he treated and loved her the wrong way, understanding how he took her and their relationship for granted, and now that she left him, he's alone crying and desperately hoping to get her back, realizing that being with her was equal to living in paradise. "Run Away" is a story of two people in love that try to escape from police brutality. The whole song is response to police's violence aimed at unarmed African-Americans in the United States, that also makes a reference to the “Hands up, don't shoot” slogan that was created after the shooting of Michael Brown. On the cheerful "This Way" the singer thanks his ex-girlfriend for leaving him when he wasn't ready for the relationship to cease, because now he has found happiness in having sex with multiple girls every night. After all the details of what's been on his feelings and what he's done after his breakup, on the last track, "Yellow Tape", he reflects on how he can't handle no more his pain, and how he's tired of his excessive lifestyle full of fake emotions that can't numb his heartbreak, ending up killing himself.

Release and promotion

On January 10, 2016, Brown previewed 9 unreleased songs during a live on Periscope, and the song "Grass Ain't Greener" on Instagram. From January through March 2016, he released videos on his Instagram profile previewing the unreleased songs "Lost and Found" and "Dead Wrong". In late February and March he performed some of the previewed songs live during his club performances in Barcelona and Madrid. On April 27 through Twitter, he announced the European leg of his One Hell of a Nite Tour, the documentary Welcome to My Life, his collaborative mixtape with his OHB group, Before the Trap: Nights in Tarzana, and the release of a new single on May 5, the day of Brown's 27th birthday. On May 3 he revealed that the single would be the already previewed "Grass Ain't Greener", which was not included in the Heartbreak on a Full Moon tracklist but was later reinstated as a bonus track.

Brown also released extra tracks on SoundCloud during this time. On July 7, 2016, he released two tracks, "My Friend" and "A Lot of Love", in the wake of the then-recent shooting in Dallas. On August 31, 2016, less than 24 hours after being released from jail on charges of suspected assault with a deadly weapon, Brown released "What Would You Do?". 

In November and December 2016, he continued to preview unreleased material from the album sessions. Finally, on December 16, 2016, he released the second official single from the album, "Party", which features guest vocals from Usher and Gucci Mane. In February he announced that "Privacy" would be the next single, which was released on March 24, 2017. Later in April he previewed the songs "Flex On You" and "I Love Her", playing them in some club appearances.

The initial track listing of Heartbreak on a Full Moon was announced by Brown on his Instagram account on May 2, 2017, saying that it would be a double-disc album of 40 tracks, and that it would be released in June 2017. On May 11, he released an additional SoundCloud track with rapper Nas called "Die Young".

In the first days of June 2017, 46 songs discarded from Brown's recent past works, and even some rejected tracks from "Heartbreak on a Full Moon", were leaked, most of them unfinished and some intended for other artists. 

In July 2017 he announced the pending release of upcoming singles from his album. Later on August 4, 2017, he released the album's fourth single "Pills & Automobiles", which features guest vocals from Yo Gotti, A Boogie Wit Da Hoodie and Kodak Black. Then on August 14, 2017, he announced the release of the fifth official single, "Questions", and on August 16, announced the album's release date of October 31, 2017. In the run up to the album's release, on October 5, 2017, Brown unveiled the official artwork on his Instagram profile, sharing a video with a visual of a blood-dripping human heart set against a pink full moon, with a snippet of the song "Heartbreak on a Full Moon" in the background.

On October 13, 2017, Brown released the promotional single "High End", that features guest vocals from Future and Young Thug, and announced the final tracklist of the album. On October 19, the singer released 3 songs from the album, "Confidence", "Tempo" and "Only 4 Me", as an anticipation for the close release. On October 25, Brown organized with Tidal a free pop-up concert in New York City to perform the singles of the album. The day after he released other 3 songs to anticipate the album, "Everybody Knows", "Hope You Do" and "Pull Up". A couple days before the dropping of the album, Brown partnered with Spotify's Rap Caviar for a segment where he painted the album's cover.

Heartbreak on a Full Moon was released digitally on October 31, 2017, and onto CD three days later by RCA Records. On December 13, 2017, he released a 12-track deluxe edition called Cuffing Season – 12 Days of Christmas, containing songs left off the original album.

Tour
On March 27, 2018, Chris Brown announced an official headlining concert tour to further promote the album, titled Heartbreak on a Full Moon Tour. The tour began on June 19 in Auburn, at White River Amphitheatre. The opening acts for the tour were 6lack, H.E.R., Rich the Kid, and Jacquees. The tour included 27 shows and ended on August 4, 2018.

Critical reception

Craig Jenkins of Vulture argued that while the album was "a bloated mess", that it was a "decent album", and wrote that "the album's first disc mixes peppy, dirty sex jams with moody revenge anthems that engage some of Brown's most grating tendencies as a performer, while the second reckons more humbly with depression." In a mixed review, HipHopDX writer Scott Glaysher stated, "There is no denying the technical flawlessness of his voice, but even those perfect pipes can't save the lifelessly formulaic songwriting."  AllMusic editor Andy Kellman said that "the stand-outs are enough to make for a 45-minute listen that surpasses his previous album, and clearing out the tracks on which Brown's tenor slips from pleading to whining makes it easier to reach them with convenience." Kellman rounded the review off stating that the album was "artistically conservative", and that "there's depth, though it does require sifting."

Commercial performance

Despite being counted for only three days of digital and streaming sales, because of its release in the middle of the chart's tracking week, Heartbreak on a Full Moon debuted at number three on the US Billboard 200, becoming Brown's ninth consecutive top 10 album on the chart, after selling 68,000 copies and earning 220,000 album-equivalent units within three days. The album was Brown's seventh solo album to debut at number one on the Billboard Top R&B/Hip-Hop Albums chart. On November 8, 2017, Heartbreak on a Full Moon was certified gold by the Recording Industry Association of America for combined sales and album-equivalent units of over 500,000 units in the United States. Brown became the first R&B male artist that went gold in a week since Usher's Confessions in 2004. In its second chart week, the album remained at number three on Billboard 200, with 110,000 copies and earning 280,000 album-equivalent units. In Australia, it entered the ARIA Albums Chart at number five, becoming his first top ten in the nation since X in 2014. In the United Kingdom, the album debuted at number 10 on the UK Albums Chart, Brown's sixth non-consecutive top 10 album on the chart. The album was eventually certified Silver by the British Phonographic Industry (BPI) for sales of over 60,000 copies in the UK. In New Zealand, the album debuted at number three on the RMNZ Albums Chart, giving Brown his seventh top ten album on the chart. Until June 2018, the album has accumulated over 3 billion streams worldwide.

Track listing
Production credits were adapted from RCA's official website.Notes  signifies a co-producer
  signifies an additional producer
  signifies an uncredited co-producerSample credits'
 "Privacy" contains an interpolation of "Tight Up Skirt", performed by Red Rat.
 "Juicy Booty" samples "Cutie Pie", performed by One Way, and contains an interpolation of California Love (Remix) performed by Tupac Shakur, Dr. Dre and Roger Troutman.
 "Questions" contains an interpolation of "Turn Me On", performed by Kevin Lyttle.
 "To My Bed" contains an interpolation of "Nice & Slow", performed by Usher.
 "Hope You Do" samples "Where I Wanna Be", performed by Donell Jones.
 "Even" contains an interpolation of "Remember the Time", performed by Michael Jackson.
 "Frustrated" contains an interpolation of "Brazilian Rhyme (Beijo Interlude)", performed by Earth, Wind & Fire.
 "This Way" contains an interpolation of "Rosa Parks", performed by Outkast.

Charts

Weekly charts

Year-end charts

Certifications

See also
 List of Billboard number-one R&B/hip-hop albums of 2017
 List of Billboard number-one R&B/hip-hop albums of 2018
 List of UK R&B Albums Chart number ones of 2017

References

Chris Brown albums
2017 albums
Albums produced by Boi-1da
Albums produced by Cardiak
Albums produced by D. A. Doman
Albums produced by Danja (record producer)
Albums produced by Hitmaka
Albums produced by Keyz (producer)
Albums produced by OG Parker
Albums produced by Scott Storch